Terrorism in the United Kingdom, according to the Home Office, poses a significant threat to the state. There have been various causes of terrorism in the UK. Before the 2000s, most attacks were linked to the Northern Ireland conflict (the Troubles). In the late 20th century there were also attacks by Islamic terrorist groups.

Since 1970, there have been at least 3,395 terrorist-related deaths in the UK, the highest in western Europe. The vast majority of the deaths were linked to the Northern Ireland conflict and happened in Northern Ireland. In mainland Great Britain, there were 430 terrorist-related deaths between 1971 and 2001. Of these, 125 deaths were linked to the Northern Ireland conflict, and 305 deaths were linked to other causes – most of the latter deaths occurred in the Lockerbie bombing. Since 2001, there have been almost 100 terrorist-related deaths in Great Britain.

The UKs CONTEST strategy aims to prevent terrorism and other forms of extremism. It places a responsibility on education and health bodies to report individuals who are deemed to be at risk of radicalisation.

1,834 people were arrested in the UK from September 2001 to December 2009 in connection with terrorism, of which 422 were charged with terrorism-related offences and 237 were convicted.

History

There have been many historically significant terrorist incidents within the United Kingdom, from the Gunpowder Plot of 1605 to the various attacks related to The Troubles of Northern Ireland. In recent history, the UK security services have focused on the threat posed by radical Islamic militant organisations within the UK, such as the cell responsible for the 7 July 2005 London bombings.

For incidents in Great Britain, see List of terrorist incidents in Great Britain and List of terrorist incidents in London.
For incidents in Northern Ireland, see Timeline of the Northern Ireland Troubles.

The British state has been accused of involvement in state terrorism in Northern Ireland.

A "restricted" 12 June 2008 MI5 analysis of "several hundred individuals known to be involved in, or closely associated with, violent extremist activity" concludes that British Islamist terrorists "are a diverse collection of individuals, fitting no single demographic profile, nor do they all follow a typical pathway to violent extremism". Around half were born in the United Kingdom, the majority are British nationals and the remainder, with a few exceptions, are in the country legally. Most UK terrorists are male, but women are sometimes aware of their husbands', brothers' or sons' activities. While the majority are in their early to mid-20s when they become radicalised, a small but not insignificant minority first become involved in violent extremism over the age of 30. Those over 30 are just as likely to have a wife and children as to be loners with no ties. MI5 says this challenges the idea that terrorists are young Muslim men driven by sexual frustration and lured to "martyrdom" by the promise of beautiful virgins waiting for them in paradise. Those involved in Islamist terrorism have educational achievement ranging from total lack of qualifications to degree-level education. However, they are almost all employed in low-grade jobs. Far from being religious zealots, a large number of those involved in terrorism do not practise their faith regularly. Many lack religious literacy and could actually be regarded as religious novices. Very few have been brought up in strongly religious households, and there is a higher than average proportion of converts. Some are involved in drug-taking, drinking alcohol and visiting prostitutes. The report claims a well-established religious identity actually protects against violent radicalisation, while the influence of clerics in radicalising Islamist terrorists has reduced in recent years.

On 29 August 2014, the British government launched a raft of counter-terrorism measures as the terrorist threat level was raised to "severe". Prime Minister David Cameron and Home Secretary Theresa May warned a terrorist attack was "highly likely", following the coming to prominence of the Islamic State of Iraq and the Levant (ISIL).

On 22 May 2017, at least 22 were killed after a bombing occurred following a concert by Ariana Grande in the most deadly terrorist attack on British soil since 2005. After a COBRA meeting, UK Prime Minister Theresa May announced that the UK's terror threat level was being raised to 'critical', its highest level. By raising the threat level to "critical", Operation Temperer was started, allowing 5,000 soldiers to replace armed police in protecting parts of the country. BBC's Frank Gardner said that the first deployment of troops is expected to be in the hundreds.

There have been calls for the publication of a report into the finance of terrorism which the government said they left unpublished for security reasons.  Tim Farron said, “Theresa May should be ashamed of the way she has dragged her heels on this issue, first as home secretary and now as prime minister. No amount of trade with dodgy regimes such as Saudi Arabia is worth putting the safety of the British public at risk, and if May is serious about our security, she would publish the report in full, immediately.”

From June 2016 to June 2017, 379 people in the UK had been arrested for terrorism-linked offences with 123 of them being charged, 105 of them for terrorism offences. This was a 68% increase from the previous year which was partly due to various Islamist terror attacks on UK soil such as the Manchester bombing, the London Bridge attack, and the Westminster attack. The report also said that 19 terrorist plots had been foiled by British police since June 2013.

Jihadist material including bomb making instructions and execution videos gets more clicks in the UK than in any other European nation and is spread among a wide range of different domains.  Internet companies have been accused of not preventing this. New measures are being considered to stop internet providers from showing this type of content including fines for internet companies that do not remove jihadist material.  David Petraeus said the Parsons Green bomb could have been made from online instructions.  Petraeus noted the technical and other skill of the terrorist websites and added, “It is clear that our counter-extremism efforts and other initiatives to combat extremism online have, until now, been inadequate. There is no doubting the urgency of this matter. The status quo clearly is unacceptable.”

Police chief, Sara Thornton fears cuts to the police budget will weaken counter terrorism.  Thornton maintains resources needed to deal with terrorist incidents are brought from mainstream policing adding to the strain on general policing.  Thornton maintains neighbourhood policing is important because it gives people confidence in the police.  Then confident people give the police information needed to prevent terrorist attacks.  Thornton said, “Fewer officers and police community support officers will cut off the intelligence that is so crucial to preventing attacks. Withdrawal from communities risks undermining their trust in us at a time when we need people to have the confidence to share information with us.”  Thornton also said, “Experts tell us that the spate of attacks in the UK and Europe are a shift not a spike in the threat, which will take 20 or 30 years to eliminate. This new normality necessitates an open-minded dialogue with government about how we respond; and our resources have got to be part of the conversation.”

Organisations

Counter Terrorism Policing is the national collaboration of police forces across the United Kingdom responsible for counter terrorism operations and strategy.

The British government has designated 58 organisations as terrorist and banned them. 44 of these organisations were banned under the Terrorism Act of 2000. Two of these were also banned under the Terrorism Act of 2006 for "glorifying terrorism." Other than the far-right neo-Nazi National Action, the other fourteen organisations operate (for the most part) in Northern Ireland, and were banned under previous legislation.

International organisations the government has designated as terrorist and banned, of whom the vast majority are of radical Islamic ideology,  are:

As of 2019, the police have stated that the fastest growing terrorist threat in the UK is from the far right.

British Loyalist
 Ulster Defence Association/Ulster Freedom Fighters
 Ulster Volunteer Force
 Loyalist Volunteer Force
 Orange Volunteers
 Red Hand Commandos
 Red Hand Defenders

Far-right

 Column 88
 Combat 18
 League of Saint George
 National Action
 National Socialist Action Party
 National Socialist Movement
 Racial Volunteer Force

Far-left
 Kurdistan Workers Party
 Revolutionary People's Liberation Party-Front

Irish Republican
Irish organisations the British government has banned are:
 Continuity Irish Republican Army
 Cumann na mBan
 Fianna Éireann
 Irish National Liberation Army
 Irish People's Liberation Organisation
 Irish Republican Army
 Saor Éire

Islamist
According to political scientist Gilles Kepel, the jihadi violence is rooted in Islamic fundamentalism in the form of Salafism, an ideology that clashes with the values of Western democracies and which entered the United Kingdom when the country gave shelter to radical Islamist leaders from around the world in London. According to Kepel, an individual progresses into violence by first becoming a salafist. Further, he states that salafist ideology has led to attacking targets which symbolizes Western culture, such as the concerts at Manchester and in the Bataclan theater or deliberately timing attacks to interfere with democratic elections. Scholar Olivier Roy disagrees, saying that the majority of Islamic terrorists are radicals first and are drawn to fundamentalist Islam as a result. He has argued that there's no evidence that they go from Salafism to terrorism, noting that Islamic terrorist Abdelhamid Abaaoud was known to violate religious rules about halal food. Roy has also argued that the burkini bans and secularist policies of France provoked religious violence in France, to which Kepel responded that Britain has no such policies and still suffered several jihadist attacks in 2017.

In July 2017, it was reported that British authorities had stripped some 150 suspected criminals with dual citizenship of their British passport, to prevent them from returning to the UK. Those deprived of their UK citizenship included both "jihadis" and "jihadi brides".

In October 2020, Islamist terrorism remained the greatest threat to the UK by volume according to Ken McCallum, the Director General of MI5.

 Abdallah Azzam Brigades, including the Ziyad al Jarrah Battalions (AAB) 
 Abu Nidal Organisation
 Abu Sayyaf
 Aden-Abyan Islamic Army
 Al-Gama'a al-Islamiyya
 Al Ghurabaa
 Al-Itihaad al-Islamiya
 Al-Muhajiroun
 Al Murabitun
 Al Qaeda
 Al-Shabaab
 Ansar al-Islam
 Ansar Al Sharia Tunisia
 Ansaru
 Ansar Bayt al Maqdis
 Ansarul Muslimina Fi Biladis Sudan (Vanguard for the protection of Muslims in Black Africa)
 Armed Islamic Group also known as GIA
 Asbat al-Ansar
 Egyptian Islamic Jihad
 Hamas
 Harakat al-Shabaab al-Mujahideen
 Harkat-ul-Jihad al-Islami
 Harkat-ul-Mujahideen
 Harkat-ul-Ansar
 Hezbollah
 Hezb-e-Islami Gulbuddin
 Imarat Kavkaz (IK) (also known as the Caucasus Emirate)
 Indian Mujahideen
 Islam4UK
 Islamic Jihad Union
 Islamic Movement of Uzbekistan
 Islamic State of Iraq and the Levant 
 Jaish-e-Mohammed
 Jamaat Ansar al-Sunna (formerly Jaish Ansar al-Sunna)
 Jamaat Ul-Furquan
 Jamaat-ul-Mujahideen 
 Jemaah Islamiyah
 Jundallah
 Kateeba al Kawthar
 Khuddam ul-Islam
 Lashkar-e-Jhangvi
 Lashkar-e-Toiba
 Libyan Islamic Fighting Group
 Minbar Ansar Deen
 Moroccan Islamic Combatant Group 
 Muslims Against Crusades
 Palestinian Islamic Jihad
 People's Mujahedin of Iran
 Popular Front for the Liberation of Palestine – General Command
 Salafist Group for Preaching and Combat
 The Saved Sect
 Sipah-e-Sahaba Pakistan (also known as Ahle Sunnat Wal Jamaat)
 Tehrik Nefaz-e Shari'at Muhammadi
 Tehrik-e Taliban Pakistan

Others
 Animal Liberation Front
 Kurdistan Freedom Hawks
 Babbar Khalsa
 Balochistan Liberation Army

See also
Crime in the United Kingdom
Islamic terrorism in the United Kingdom
Prevention of Terrorism Act (Northern Ireland)
Right-wing terrorism in the United Kingdom
Terrorism Acts
Terrorism in the European Union
The Troubles

References

Further reading
 Blackbourn, Jessie. "Counter-Terrorism and Civil Liberties: The United Kingdom Experience, 1968-2008." Journal of the Institute of Justice and International Studies 8 (2008): 63+
 Bonner, David. "United Kingdom: the United Kingdom response to terrorism." Terrorism and Political Violence 4.4 (1992): 171-205. online
 Chin, Warren. Britain and the war on terror: Policy, strategy and operations (Routledge, 2016).
 Clutterbuck, Lindsay. "Countering Irish Republican terrorism in Britain: Its origin as a police function." Terrorism and Political Violence 18.1 (2006) pp: 95-118.
 Greer, Steven. "Terrorism and Counter-Terrorism in the UK: From Northern Irish Troubles to Global Islamist Jihad." in Counter-Terrorism, Constitutionalism and Miscarriages of Justice (Hart Publishing, 2018) pp. 45-62.
 Hamilton, Claire. "Counter-Terrorism in the UK." in Contagion, Counter-Terrorism and Criminology (Palgrave Pivot, Cham, 2019) pp. 15-47.
 Hewitt, Steve. "Great Britain: Terrorism and counter-terrorism since 1968." in Routledge Handbook of Terrorism and Counterterrorism (Routledge, 2018) pp. 540-551.
 Martínez-Peñas, Leandro, and Manuela Fernández-Rodríguez. "Evolution of British Law on Terrorism: From Ulster to Global Terrorism (1970–2010)." in Post 9/11 and the State of Permanent Legal Emergency (Springer, 2012) pp. 201-222.
 O'Day, Alan. "Northern Ireland, Terrorism, and the British State." in Terrorism: Theory and Practice (Routledge, 2019) pp. 121-135.
 Sacopulos, Peter J. "Terrorism in Britain: Threat, reality, response." Studies in Conflict & Terrorism 12.3 (1989): 153-165.
 Staniforth, Andrew, and Fraser Sampson, eds. The Routledge companion to UK counter-terrorism (Routledge, 2012).
 Sinclair, Georgina. "Confronting terrorism: British Experiences past and present." Crime, Histoire & Sociétés/Crime, History & Societies 18.2 (2014): 117-122. online
 Tinnes, Judith, ed. "Bibliography: Northern Ireland conflict (the troubles)." Perspectives on Terrorism 10.1 (2016): 83-110. online
 Wilkinson, Paul, ed. Terrorism: British Perspectives (Dartmouth, 1993).

External links
Efforts to curb politicised Islam backfiring - study
DEAD LINK: Pak-UK talks for joint framework on anti-terrorism Open this result in new window
 MI5 watch 2,000 terror suspects  BBC News, May 4, 2007.
 Counter Terrorism Policing 

 
United Kingdom
Human rights abuses in the United Kingdom